The Louisiana Library Association (LLA) is a professional organization for Louisiana's librarians and library workers. It is headquartered in Baton Rouge, Louisiana. The LLA publishes The LLA Bulletin (est. 1937) and Louisiana Libraries magazine.

It was originally founded in 1909, called the Louisiana State Library Association, after a call for a statewide library group from the New Orleans Library Club. An initial meeting of thirty people was held at Tulane University in 1909 with the goal of increasing the number of trained librarians in the state and drafting library legislation. The main speaker was Chalmers Hadley from the American Library Association. The LLA fell into some disorder during and after World War I, and was reorganized in 1925. The LLA Convention or Conference began in 1909 has been held annually (except for 1914-1924, 1933, and 1945).

LLA became a chapter member of the American Library Association in 1939, and has been a member since then with the exception of a period from March 5, 1963 through mid-1965 when the Executive Board of LLA resigned from ALA because the organization was not integrated. LLA had voted in 1947 to admit Black members, but because of state segregation laws had not been able to implement the change. Before 1965 the Louisiana Colored Teachers’ Association (later called the Louisiana Education Association) had a libraries section which counted public, school, and academic librarians  among its members. The first Black president of LLA was Idella Washington who was elected in 1998.

The Association bestows the Essae Martha Culver award for lifetime contributions to librarianship in Louisiana. In 2019 the award was given to Dr. Alma Dawson, the first African American so honored.

References

External links
 Louisiana Library Association website
 Southeastern Library Association website

Louisiana
Organizations based in Louisiana